International Open Film Festival (IOFF) is an independent film festival based in the United States, owned by an organization in the United States, and open to filmmakers from all over the world.

Background 
IOFF was established with the aim to promote local and international talent. The film festival holds an annual contest where they accept films from several different categories such as educational films, feature films, films about women, Bengali films, and more. In total, the film festival has listed 32 film categories and has received more than 4,000 submissions from 105 countries.

It has executed certain safety measures to protect the illegal downloading and redistribution of the films on their site by utilizing advanced technology to minimize the possibility of theft. IOFF developed the Independent Film Collaborative (IFC) program to produce an international feature film directed by filmmakers from different countries. Moreover, they are going to establish a Film Market, Co-production Market, Work-in-progress Lab, Script-writing Lab, 48-hour Film-making Project, Film-making Grant etc.

Selection Process 
The film festival selects 338 jury members representing different countries. The jury members and online audiences score the film. The film festival recruits scriptwriters, filmmakers, critics, and producers with experience in producing, directing, and judging contemporary films. The results of the film competition are calculated and based on the scores given by jury members, selected audience members, and special jury members.

Special Recognition 
World record holder for recruiting 338 jury members from 105 countries in an international film festival
World record holder for awarding the highest number of awards in an international film festival
World record holder for having over 4,000 scripts and films from 105 countries enter the competition in its first year
World record holder for awarding 103 “The Country Best Award” to 105 countries
Earned acclaim from international outlets as one of the most prestigious film festivals in the world
Earned acclaim from global filmmakers as one of the most prestigious film festivals in the world
Earned acclaim by international film festival circuits for their implementation of a unique strategy of openly communicating with international filmmakers from 24 hours
FilmFreeway, a company based in Canada, included IOFF in their list of the 100 best reviewed film festivals in a survey.

Events 
IOFF provides screenings, workshops, lectures, discussions, and industry support to participants.

Film Categories 
Bengali Films
Young Filmmaker
Women Filmmaker
Treatment/ Synopsis
Television (Program)
Television (Pilot)
South Asian Film
Short Film (Work-In-Progress)
Short Film (Student)
Short Film
Short Documentary
Screenplay (Short)
Screenplay (Feature)
Out of Competition
Music Video
Movie Trailer
Film on Women
Film on Religion
Film on Nature/Environment/ Wildlife
Film on Human Rights
Film on Disability Issues
Film Made By Kids
Feature Film (Work-In-Progress)
Feature Film (Student)
Feature Film
Experimental Film
Educational Film
Documentary Feature Film
Debut Short Film
Debut Feature Film
Commercial/TVC
Children Films
Animation Film

Awards 
Best Film of the Fest
Best Award
Jury Award
Special Mention Award
Award of Recognition
Country Best Award
Official Selection/ Finalist Award
International Jury Award
Semi-Finalist Award

References

External links 
 (Offline)

Film festivals in the United States
Internet film festivals